Andhi Gali (English language:Dead End) is a 1984 Hindi drama film directed and written by Buddhadev Dasgupta,  and based on Bengali story, Ghar Bari by Dibyendu Palit.
It stars Deepti Naval, Mahesh Bhatt and Kulbhushan Kharbanda. The Naxalite movement in Bengal in the 1970s forms a backdrop to the film.

References

External links
 

1984 films
1980s Hindi-language films
1984 drama films
Films directed by Buddhadeb Dasgupta
Films set in the 1970s
Films about Naxalism
Films based on short fiction
Indian drama films
Hindi-language drama films